Douglas Douglas-Hamilton may refer to:

 Douglas Douglas-Hamilton, 8th Duke of Hamilton (1756 – 1799)
 Douglas Douglas-Hamilton, 14th Duke of Hamilton (1903 – 1973)

See also
Douglas Hamilton (disambiguation)
Douglas-Hamilton